SEAL Team is an American military action drama television series created for CBS by Benjamin Cavell. The series is produced by CBS Studios, with Cavell serving as showrunner. The series stars David Boreanaz, Max Thieriot, Jessica Paré, Neil Brown Jr., A. J. Buckley, Toni Trucks and Judd Lormand joined the principal cast in later seasons. The series premiered on September 27, 2017.

 On May 9, 2019, CBS renewed the series for a third season, which premiered on October 2, 2019. On May 6, 2020, CBS renewed the series for a fourth season which premiered on December 2, 2020. In May 2021, the series was renewed for a fifth season and will be moving to Paramount+. The fifth season premiered on October 10, 2021. On February 1, 2022, Paramount+ renewed the series for a sixth season which premiered on September 18, 2022. On January 18, 2023, Paramount+ renewed the series for a seventh season.

Series overview

Episodes

Season 1 (2017–18)

Season 2 (2018–19)

Season 3 (2019–20)

Season 4 (2020–21)

Season 5 (2021–22)

Season 6 (2022)

Ratings

Summary

Season 1

Home media

References

External links
 
 

Lists of American drama television series episodes